S. S. Sivasankar is an Indian Tamil politician and writer from the Dravida Munnetra Kazhagam (DMK). He has represented Andimadam (2006-11), and Kunnam (2011-16; 2021-) constituencies in Tamil Nadu Legislative Assembly. From 7 May 2021 to 29 March 2022, he served as Minister for the Welfare of Backward, Most Backward and Denotified Communities in the Council of Ministers under M.K. Stalin.  On 29 March 2022, he assumed charge as the State's Minister for Transport.

Sivasankar has authored three books: Makkaludan En Anubavangal (or Makkalodu Naan) (2015), Chozhan Raja Prapthi (2019), and Thozhar Chozhan (2019).

Early life 
Sivasankar was born on 24 March 1969 in the village of  Devanur near Andimadam in Ariyalur district, Tamil Nadu. His father S. Sivasubramanian was an ardent supporter of the Dravidian movement and was instrumental in strengthening the DMK in the district. Sivasankar's mother is Sivarajeshwari.

After attending Andimadam Government School, Sivasankar studied Bachelor of Engineering in the Department of Electrical and Electronics Engineering at  Annamalai University. After graduating in 1991, he worked for a private company in  Bangalore until 1993.

Politics

Beginning and party posts 
Sivasankar's political career began when he participated in an Anti-Hindi conference organized by the DMK in Tiruchirappalli in December 1978. He entered full-time politics in 1993, and was elected as the DMK Secretary of the Andimadam Union in 1999. In 2001, he was appointed DMK Secretary of the newly created Ariyalur district.  Then, he once again became the District Secretary for Ariyalur and is presently in that post.

Civic Body Member (1996-2006) 
From 1996 to 2001, Sivasankar served as Deputy President of Perambalur District Panchayat. Then he served as a member of  Ariyalur District Panchayat till 2006.

Member of Legislative Assembly (2006-16 ; 2021-) 
In the 2006 Tamil Nadu Legislative Assembly election, Sivasankar successfully contested in his home constituency of Andimadam.

In the 2011 Assembly election, he won from Kunnam. On 31 January 2014, he was suspended for an entire assembly session for tearing up a copy of the customary speech by Konijeti Rosaiah, then Governor of Tamil Nadu.

In the 2016 Assembly election, Sivasankar contested from Ariyalur constituency and lost by 2,621 votes.

In the 2021 Assembly election, he re-contested in Kunnam and won by 6,329 votes.

Ministership (2021-) 
Following the victory of the DMK alliance in the 2021 election, Sivasankar was inducted into the M. K. Stalin ministry as Minister for the Welfare of Backward, Most Backward and Denotified Communities. On 29 March 2022, his portfolio was transferred to Raja Kannappan and he in turn replaced the latter as Minister for Transport.

Other Posts 
Sivasankar was interested in photography right from his college days. Consequently, he served as Secretary of the Photographers' Association. He has been a member of the Perambalur District Athletics Association and as President of the Tamil Nadu Silambam Association.

Works

Personal life 
Sivasankar's residence is in Rajaji Nagar, Ariyalur. His wife Gayathridevi is a physician. The couple has two sons: Sivasaran and Sivasurya.

Media appearance 
Sivasankar was one of the participants in Season 14 episode 21 of the television show Neeya Naana hosted by Gopinath Chandran on Vijay TV. In this episode (titled "Gopinath discusses Tamil Nadu") that aired on 10 February 2013, a student presented her position against reservation, citing 'arbitrary' caste-based concessions.  In reply, Sivasankar famously gave an explanation:

Notes

External links 

 Sivasankar
 Sivasankar.S.S

References

1969 births
Living people
People from Ariyalur district
Indian Tamil people
Dravidian movement
Tamil writers
Tamil Nadu politicians
Dravida Munnetra Kazhagam politicians
Tamil Nadu ministers
Tamil Nadu MLAs 2006–2011
Tamil Nadu MLAs 2011–2016
Tamil Nadu MLAs 2021–2026